Poutavanh Phengthalangsy (born 10 February 1971) is a Laotian sprinter. He competed in the men's 4 × 100 metres relay at the 1996 Summer Olympics.

References

1971 births
Living people
Athletes (track and field) at the 1996 Summer Olympics
Laotian male sprinters
Olympic athletes of Laos
Place of birth missing (living people)